The Beginning of the End may refer to:

Film and television
 Beginning of the End (film), a 1957 American science fiction film

Television episodes
 "Beginning of the End" (Agents of S.H.I.E.L.D.), 2014
 "Beginning of the End" (Orange Is the New Black), 2019
 "Beginning of the End" (Teenage Mutant Ninja Turtles 2003), 2006
 "The Beginning of the End" (30 Rock), 2012
 "The Beginning of the End" (Amphibia), 2022
 "The Beginning of the End" (Grimm), 2016
 "The Beginning of the End" (Lost), 2008
 "The Beginning of the End" (Merlin), 2008
 "The Beginning of the End" (Ozark), 2022
 "The Beginning of the End" (Teenage Mutant Ninja Turtles 1987), 1996

Literature
 "The Beginning of the End", a poem by Gerard Manley Hopkins
 The Beginning of the End, a 1998 book by Angelo Quattrochi and Tom Nairn about the May 68 events in France

Music
 The Beginning of the End (band), a Bahamian funk group

Albums
 The Beginning of the End (Sworn Enemy album) or the title song, 2006
 The Beginning of the End (UTP album), 2004
The Beginning of the End, by Dreamcatcher, 2019
 Beginning of the End, an EP by Discharge, 2006

Songs
 "Beginning of the End" (Status Quo song), 2007
 "Beginning of the End", by Judas Priest from Redeemer of Souls, 2014
 "Beginning of the End", by Spineshank from Self-Destructive Pattern, 2003
 "Beginning of the End", by Systematic from Somewhere in Between, 2001
 "Beginning of the End", by Weezer from the Bill & Ted Face the Music film soundtrack, 2020
 "The Beginning of the End", by Boogiemonsters from God Sound, 1997
 "The Beginning of the End", by HIM from Greatest Lovesongs Vol. 666, 1997
 "The Beginning of the End", by Nine Inch Nails from Year Zero, 2007
 "The Beginning of the End", by Rob Zombie from Hellbilly Deluxe, 1998
 "The Beginning of the End", by Testament from Souls of Black, 1990

See also
 The End of the Beginning (disambiguation)
 The Beginning or the End, a 1947 docudrama film